Harold Pryor "Spud" Owen (March 10, 1905 – February 8, 1981) was an American football, basketball, and baseball player and coach.  He served as the head football coach at Culver–Stockton College in Canton, Missouri from 1948 to 1951, Eureka College in Eureka, Illinois from 1952 to 1955, and Elmhurst College in Elmhurst, Illinois from 1956 to 1958, compiling a career college football coaching record of 21–60–5.  Owen was also the athletic director at Eureka from 1952 to 1956 and coached golf at Elmhurst.

A native of Orrick, Missouri, Owen attended William Jewell College in Liberty, Missouri, where he played football, basketball, and baseball.  He as an all-Missouri Intercollegiate Athletic Association (MIAA) selection as a halfback in football and all-state at guard in basketball.  Owen played Minor League Baseball for several teams in the Nebraska State League and was a player and manager for the North Platte Buffalos in 1932.

Head coaching record

College football

References

External links
 
 

1905 births
1981 deaths
American football halfbacks
Guards (basketball)
Player-coaches
Beatrice Blues players
Culver–Stockton Wildcats football coaches
Elmhurst Bluejays football coaches
Eureka Red Devils athletic directors
Eureka Red Devils football coaches
McCook Generals players
Eureka Red Devils men's basketball coaches
William Jewell Cardinals baseball players
William Jewell Cardinals football players
William Jewell Cardinals men's basketball players
College golf coaches in the United States
High school basketball coaches in Illinois
High school football coaches in Illinois
People from Ray County, Missouri
Players of American football from Missouri
Baseball players from Missouri
Basketball players from Missouri